Víctor Gómez Perea (born 1 April 2000) is a Spanish footballer who plays as a right back for Portuguese club S.C. Braga, on loan from RCD Espanyol.

Club career
Born in Olesa de Montserrat, Barcelona, Catalonia, Gómez started his career at hometown side EF EFO 87, and subsequently represented RCD Espanyol, FC Barcelona and CF Damm before returning to the Pericos in 2015. He made his senior debut with the reserves on 25 March 2017 at the age of just 16, coming on as a second-half substitute for Carles Soria in a 0–2 Segunda División B home loss against Villarreal CF B.

Gómez was regularly used during the 2017–18 campaign, as his side achieved promotion from Tercera División, and scored his first senior goal on 13 May 2018 by netting the game's only in a home success over CF Pobla de Mafumet. On 3 August of that year, he extended his contract until 2025.

Gómez made his first team – and La Liga – debut on 20 October 2019, starting in a 0–1 home loss against Villarreal CF. He finished the campaign with 21 appearances overall, as his side suffered relegation.

On 10 September 2020, Gómez was loaned to CD Mirandés of the Segunda División for the 2020–21 season. He scored his first professional goal on 10 October, concluding a 2–0 away defeat of CE Sabadell FC. The following 20 August, he moved to Málaga CF in the same division on a one-year loan deal, reuniting with former Mirandés manager José Alberto. 

Gómez moved to Primeira Liga side S.C. Braga also in a temporary deal on 29 June 2022, with the option of a €2 million transfer and a five-year contract. He made his debut on 8 August as the season opened with a 3–3 home draw against Sporting CP, in which he suffered a right thigh injury and was taken off before half time.

Honours

International
Spain U19
UEFA European Under-19 Championship: Champion 2019

Spain U18
Mediterranean Games: Gold Medal 2018

Spain U17
UEFA European Under-17 Championship: Champion 2017
FIFA Under-17 World Cup: Runner-up 2017

References

External links
 
 
 

2000 births
Living people
People from Baix Llobregat
Sportspeople from the Province of Barcelona
Spanish footballers
Footballers from Catalonia
Association football defenders
La Liga players
Segunda División players
Segunda División B players
RCD Espanyol B footballers
RCD Espanyol footballers
CD Mirandés footballers
Málaga CF players
Primeira Liga players
S.C. Braga players
Spain youth international footballers
Mediterranean Games gold medalists for Spain
Mediterranean Games medalists in football
Competitors at the 2018 Mediterranean Games
Spain under-21 international footballers
Spanish expatriate footballers
Spanish expatriate sportspeople in Portugal
Expatriate footballers in Portugal
CF Damm players